Dolph also known as Dolph the Fascist Hippo is a fictional character appearing in the Danish television show Dolph og Wulff med venner (Dolph and Wulff with friends), played by Danish actor Jonas Schmidt, who is otherwise known in Denmark from another popular comedy series, P.I.S., and a long-running series of Toyota commercials. 

Dolph is a large, fascist, baby-blue hippopotamus usually appearing armed with a baseball bat. He first appeared as a minor character in the Danish cartoon strip Wulffmorgenthaler, which appears daily in the newspaper Politiken, though he had already been created for the yet unaired TV-show at that point, and a very early version had appeared in the music video for the song "Oak Tree Girl" by Powersolo in early 2004, directed by Anders Morgenthaler. In 2005, the TV station DR2 aired a show based on the cartoon. Four characters appeared in the show, the two authors of the strip (Mikael Wulff and Anders Morgenthaler) plus two of its minor characters; Dolph and Margit, a feminist and politically correct squirrel. As could be expected, Dolph had a very strained relationship with the show's other characters. The show ran for 10 episodes. Dolph is named after Swedish actor Dolph Lundgren. 

It quickly turned out that Dolph was the most popular character in the show, and DR2 announced that Dolph would return in 2005. On 28 October 2005, Dolph returned to the screen in a new show co-starring with Mikael Wulff but without both Margit the Squirrel and Anders Morgenthaler. The show had also been renamed from Wulffmorgenthaler to Dolph & Wulff. The show ran for 10 episodes. The next season, now in the format of a talkshow, Dolph og Wullf med venner, began in March 2006. The character has, since that season, been used sparingly, having only reappeared on rare occasions.

Personality
Dolph suffers from megalomania, uncontrolled rage, paranoia, aggression, and xenophobia, in the literal sense of the word xenophobia, whenever he sees a black person, he starts screaming and attempts to hide; at one time he claimed that a single black male was actually an army of tribeleaders from Botswana, as an excuse for his going into hiding. He is a racist, but on closer inspection, he in fact hates virtually everybody else ("most German people" is a notable exception, highlighting his own ignorance of history). He often refers to himself in the third-person singular. He constantly tries to convince the world that it should accept him as its sole ruler, but is frustrated by his lack of success. Although a Fascist, Dolph has never made any references to either Jews or the Holocaust and is apparently not a declared anti-Semite. Nor does he use any Nazi or Fascist symbols, although he clearly admires Hitler. On the other hand, he has no respect for virtually anyone else, and regrets the abolition of apartheid. He is a firm believer in military dictatorship and nuclear power – preferably in the form of nuclear weapons. He is a firm opposer of democracy. He has – unsuccessfully – attempted to blow up the Danish parliament, Christiansborg. This plan went foul when his accomplice forgot to bring the bomb.

Dolph constantly claims that he has received training as both a ninja and by the special forces, and that he is an expert in stealth techniques. He has – so far – provided little proof for any of these stories. The fact that he is incredibly obese seems to point to the contrary. His all-important hero is a Danish elite soldier, B.S. Christiansen, who appeared in episode eight of Dolph & Wulff. Dolph has also appeared in a fight-AIDS campaign, stating that "AIDS is a weak disease, it is totally unfit for the society of the future (...) Had it been a strong disease it would go for the strong members of society". Dolph has become a cult figure and the show has many fans. The creator Mikael Wulff has in the past expressed dissatisfaction with some of the fans who tend to take Dolph far too seriously and who are actually agreeing with him, seemingly not realising that Dolph is supposed to make fun of racists.

Dolph has found a few persons worthy to contribute to what he refers to as "the society of the future". They include Steven Seagal, Chuck "Texas Ranger" Norris, Jean-Claude Van Damme, Danish elite soldier B.S. Christiansen, singer Helmut Lotti (he insists that Helmut Lotti can only be German, while he is actually Belgian), Arnold Schwarzenegger, Danish football player Stig Tøfting, Prince Joachim and most German people. A few members of his list of hopeless cases include baby seals, hippies, male hairdressers, and former Danish Prime Minister Anders Fogh Rasmussen. Despite Dolph's fondness of his baseball bat, which he believes can solve virtually every problem, the Wulffmorgenthaler show showed no real violence. Dolph & Wulff is more violent, although no real violence is shown. In Dolph & Wulff, episode 1, Dolph apparently kills a character called "Mogens, the naughty kitty", in order to release himself from a contract bound to by ninja honour. In Episode 2, Dolph creates a diversion to free Mikael Wulff who is held captive by a crazy farmer who wants to kill him with a chainsaw. This is accomplished when he empties a can of acid in a barrel containing the farmer's pet pig. In both examples, no real violence is seen.

He often claims to hate Wulff, referring to him as being a hobbit, because of his height, but he actually seems to care about Wulff, saving him on several occasions, and, after a fight where Dolph was essentially fired, he gave Wulff a "SWAT Team startkit", consisting of a moustache, in an attempt to apologise.

Although Dolph adamantly denies it, he only eats salad and certain plant seeds. How he has managed become obese on this diet is unknown. His stomach is highly intolerant to pork. He was seen eating pork in episode 3, which almost instantly caused him to have extremely severe diarrhoea.

Dolph fell into coma and was shortly clinically dead following a failed plastic operation but was revived by his hero, B.S. Christiansen. After his return to life, Dolph joined B.S. Christiansen on a secret mission with his squad of special elite soldiers, leaving Wullf without any career possibilities at all, not counting Wulff's idea for a Crocodile Dundee style show, mainly about himself wearing a leather hat.
Dolph returned in the next episode, since his mission was accomplished, with 9000 baby seals dead.

A running gag with Dolph was that despite his fascist exterior and claiming a huge love of all action movies and war, in some cases, such as when he is afraid, woozy or thinks that he is not being watched, he will express love of Meg Ryan, and especially Sleepless in Seattle, of which he hopes that they will make a sequel.

The actor inside Dolph, Jonas Schmidt, co-starred with Dolph's great hero B.S. Christiansen in the Danish movie In China They Eat Dogs. Both played police officers.

In the video game Hitman: Blood Money, Dolph makes a cameo in a newspaper after the "Curtains Down" level. It reads "Hippo bleu est invisible, personne peut le voir. Partir furtivement comme un ninja japonais. Vous etes tous ouverure d'anus de 100% Oui Monsieur!" Translated into English it says something to the effect of: "Blue Hippopotamus is invisible, nobody can see him. He leaves stealthy like a Japanese ninja. You are all 100% assholes! Yes Sir!" Dolph's eyes appear alongside the quote; also, in the first level, which is featured in the demo, a baseball bat can be found in the target's office, bearing the signature "Dolph" on it.

References

External links
 Dolph's official home on Danmarks Radio
 The official home of the comic strip originally featuring Dolph
 A collection of the comic strips that contain Dolph
 
 

Comedy television characters
Comics characters introduced in 2003
Fictional hippopotamuses